The Czech Republic national under-19 speedway team is the national under-19 motorcycle speedway team of the Czech Republic and is controlled by the Autoklub of the Czech Republic. The team started in Team U-19 European Championship in all editions, but only one they quality to the final (2009). The Individual competition was won by Lukáš Dryml (2000).

Competition

See also 
 Czech Republic national speedway team
 Czech Republic national under-21 speedway team

External links 
 (cs) Autoklub of the Czech Republic webside

National speedway teams
Speedway U-19
Team